Salt as Wolves is the tenth album by American singer/songwriter Jeffrey Foucault, released in 2015. It debuted at number 7 in the Billboard Top Blues Album Chart for the week of November 7, 2015.

The planning of the album started when Foucault was in Iowa sharing the stage with The Pines, a Minneapolis-based group that included the sons of Bo Ramsey, who had produced Foucault's album Ghost Repeater. Ramsey sat in with the group and afterwards Foucault arranged for him to work on the recordings for Salt as Wolves. (The album title comes from the Shakespeare play Othello.) "Blues for Jessie Mae" is a tribute to blues singer Jessie Mae Hemphill.

Reception

Writing for The New York Times, critic Ben Ratliff wrote that "Foucault sings in a rich, textured, word-smearing voice about subjects of burned-out middle age: love, lying, regret, highways, hauntings, escape, aloneness, forgiveness, the value of a simple thing, the void without it." He called the album " immaculately tailored within a certain tradition... It is aesthetically informed up to the eyes. It sounds casual, but it can grow oppressive quickly.

Track listing 
All songs by Jeffrey Foucault unless otherwise noted.
 "Des Moines" – 3:14
"Rico" – 4:12
"Left This Town" – 3:10
"I Love You (And You Are a Fool)" – 2:29
"Blues for Jessie Mae" – 3:53
"Slow Talker" – 3:57
"Jesus Will Fix It for You" (Jessie Mae Hemphill) – 4:41
"Oh Mama" – 4:20
"Hurricane Lamp" – 2:59
"Strange Heat and Thunder" – 3:15
"Paradise" – 3:17
"Take Your Time" (Foucault, Billy Conway) – 3:55

Personnel
Jeffrey Foucault – vocals, guitar 
Caitlin Canty – background and harmony vocals
Billy Conway – drums
Bo Ramsey – guitar
Jeremy Moses Curtis – bass

References 

2015 albums
Jeffrey Foucault albums